Charles Hope may refer to:

Charles Hope, 1st Earl of Hopetoun (1681–1742), Scottish nobleman
Charles Hope-Weir (1710–1791), politician, son of the 1st Earl of Hopetoun
Charles Hope, Lord Granton (1763–1851), Scottish politician and judge
Charles Hope (politician) (1808–1893), Lieutenant Governor of the Isle of Man, 1845–1860
Charles Hope (British Army officer) (1768–1828), Major General and politician
Charles Hope (American football) (born 1970), American football player
Charles Hope, 3rd Marquess of Linlithgow (1912–1987)
Charles Hope (art historian) (born April 1945)